Syncrude Canada Ltd. is one of the world's largest producers of synthetic crude oil from oil sands and the largest single source producer in Canada. Including fully realized prospective reserves, current production capacity could be sustained for well over 90 years.

The company is a joint venture between four partners (Suncor Energy (58.74%), Imperial Oil (25%), Sinopec (9.03%) and CNOOC (7.23%)).  As a result, Syncrude is not traded directly, but rather through the individual owners.

The ownership board must approve all annual operating budgets and proposed capital spending projects, and are required to provide the funding for said activities based on their ownership share.

History

Syncrude was formed as a research consortium in 1964 by Ryan Sheppard. Construction at the Syncrude site began in 1973, and it officially opened in 1978. Starting in 1996, Syncrude has been expanding its operations. The total cost of this stage of expansion was $470 million.
Between 1998 and 2001, a new mine, Aurora, was opened 35 km north of the original site, and further debottlenecking was undertaken. Production started in Aurora in July 2001. Total cost for this stage was $1 billion.

A third stage of expansion was undertaken between 2001 and 2006, in which a second train at the Aurora line came online and the Mildred Lake upgrader was expanded. The expansion added  to Syncrude's production ( a year assuming this is average). The cost was $8.4 billion, a substantial cost overrun over the original estimate of $5.7 billion.

On April 12, 2010, ConocoPhillips agreed to sell its share to Sinopec, a Chinese state-owned oil company. The sale, for $4.65 billion, was completed on June 25, 2010.

The second tallest smokestack in western Canada, 183 m (600 ft) in height, is located at its facility.

In April 2016, Suncor announced that they had reached a $937-million deal to acquire  Murphy Oil Corp.'s five per cent stake in the Syncrude project north of Fort McMurray, Alta. This follows the hostile takeover of Canadian Oil Sands less than a year ago, and will increase its interest in Syncrude from just under 49 per cent to nearly 54 per cent, making it the majority shareholder of the project.

The 2016 Fort McMurray wildfire forced a complete shutdown of Syncrude's facilities.

Controversies

Pollution
Air releases of combined gases without volatile organic compounds (VOCs) by Syncrude Canada in 2005 were 129,741,321 (kg) in total, including ammonia (4,302,361 kg), sulphuric acid (1,129,425 kg), xylene (501,461 kg), etc. The company was also ranked as having the seventh highest air releases of combined gases (without VOC) in Canada in 2005.  Syncrude's Mildred Lake Plant Site is the largest greenhouse gas emitter in Canada emitting 12,359,420 tonnes of CO2 equivalent in 2012.
Research published in 2019 indicated that the intensity of CO2 emissions at the Syncrude Mildred Lake site may be 123% larger than calculations from publicly reported data would indicate.

Oil sands tailings pond water 

Syncrude is a member of Canada's Oil Sands Innovation Alliance (COSIA), an alliance of oil sands producers formed in 2012, who share research on Environmental Priority Areas (EPAs) such as tailing pond water and greenhouse gases. One of the major challenges facing COSIA is the treatment of oil sands tailings pond water. "Tailings are the sand, silt, clay and water found naturally in oil sands that remain following the mining and bitumen extraction process." The problem stems from the hot water process used by Suncor and Syncrude to extract bitumen from the Athabasca Oil Sands which produce large quantities of tailings pond sludge which remains stable for decades. By 1990 it was considered to be the "imminent environmental constraint to future use of the hot water process."
Syncrude also contributes to the industry-funded Joint Oil sands Monitoring Program which was created in 2012 and managed by the federal and Alberta governments.
According to a 2013 article published in Environmental Science: Processes & Impacts, the tailings ponds contain toxic chemicals such as "naphthenic acids (NAs) and process chemicals (e.g., alkyl sulphates, quaternary ammonium compounds, and alkylphenol ethoxylates)." The study used the computer program (CXTFIT) to evaluate the transport behaviour of these contaminants through the foundation as well as underground. The chemicals seep "through the foundation of the tailings pond to the subsurface, potentially affecting the quality of groundwater."

In an article accepted for publication in Environmental Science and Technology journal in January 2014, Environment Canada's Richard Frank and his team of scientists confirmed that, using new technology, they were able to "fingerprint the mix of groundwater chemicals in the area" proving that oil sands tailings pond water had leached into groundwater and the Athabasca River. The study undertaken by a new federal-provincial oil sands monitoring program used new $1.6-million technology acquired in 2010. The equipment is able to "fingerprint chemicals and trace them back to where they came from."

Greenpeace lawsuit 
In August 2008, Syncrude Canada filed a lawsuit against Greenpeace Canada for $120,000, plus costs, after 11 Greenpeace activists went on to the company's Aurora North oil sands site July 24, 2008, to unfurl anti-oil sands banners and unsuccessfully block a tailings pipe. Company spokesperson Mark Kruger said the company filed the lawsuit—which also names the activists individually—largely because of safety concerns as the activists were "unfamiliar with an industrial operation, and unfamiliar with some of the safety hazards that can be present... We just want to ensure that, in the future, nobody is putting themselves at unnecessary risk."

Greenpeace chose the Syncrude site for the protest because in April 2008, 1600 migrating ducks died after landing on a tailings pond at the site (Syncrude was fined $3 million.)

Sponsorships

Keyano College
In 2004, Syncrude announced an $800,000 multi-year donation, $500,000 of which was dedicated to the new community Syncrude Sport and Wellness Centre and the balance to Keyano Theatre’s Arts Alive Series and student scholarships. In 2005, Syncrude invested another $200,000 and took the naming rights to the Syncrude Sports and Wellness Centre at Keyano College.

See also
 Canadian Centre for Energy Information
 History of the petroleum industry in Canada (oil sands and heavy oil)
 Scotford Upgrader
 Suncor

References

Further reading

External links
 
Canadian Oil Sands Trust
Pollution Watch Canada

Oil companies of Canada
Athabasca oil sands
Companies based in Alberta
Fort McMurray
Energy companies established in 1964
Non-renewable resource companies established in 1964
Joint ventures
ExxonMobil subsidiaries
Canadian companies established in 1964